Barrington Hills is a village located about  northwest of Chicago in the U.S. state of Illinois. Per the 2020 census, the population was 4,114. The Village of Barrington Hills was incorporated in 1957.

The suburban village is included in the greater Barrington area. Many very affluent residents live on large estates and commute to downtown Chicago. A minimum  zoning restriction has been in effect on new construction since 1963, but the existence of equestrian farms antedates the village by decades. Farming and horse raising are allowed. 
Barrington Hills includes farms and estates such as Hill 'N Dale Farms, owned by Richard L. Duchossois, former owner of the Arlington Park racetrack, and the Bank Note Farm. The identification of the area with horses carries over to the names Broncos and Colts for school teams.

History

Barrington Center Church

Barrington Center Church was built in 1853 by the Barrington Methodist Episcopal Society.  A memorial plaque outside the church lists 91 area residents - one woman and 90 men - who served in the Civil War. Since the 1980s, the church building has been used by a Korean-American congregation, the New Friends Wesleyan Church.

In 1860, about 18 immigrant families of Czech ancestry settled along the east side of the Fox River, near the future site of Fox River Grove. In 1867, land was purchased at the southwest corner of Church and River - Algonquin roads, and construction was started on St. John Nepomucene Chapel, named after the patron saint of Bohemia. Completed in 1873, the chapel was never served by its own priest, and currently services are scheduled only once a year. The chapel and its cemetery are owned by the St. John Nepomucene Catholic Cemetery Association, making it the only privately owned Catholic chapel and cemetery in the Rockford Diocese.

Railroad and gentleman farms
Starting about 1900, business executives from Chicago, many of whom were tied to the railroad industry, purchased the rolling farms and subdivided them into large summer estates. One such individual was Spencer C. Otis, who by 1910 is credited with purchasing  of farmland along what was then Goose Lake Road but is now known as Otis Road and creating Hawthorne Farm. Otis was a "gentleman farmer" of the era. He worked in Chicago commerce, but his hobby was dairy farming on his large country estate. Several of his business associates, including George E. Van Hagen, also built large estates in the area and ran their summer homes as year-round dairy farms.

Barrington Hills Country Club
The land was donated by three of the club's early founders: H. Stillson Hart, who owned the farmstead known as Hart Hills just to the east of the club; George E. Van Hagen of Wakefield Farm, who owned the land just to the west of the club; and J.R. Cardwell, whose Oak Knoll Farm swelled along the winding Oak Knoll Road on the club's northern end. Van Hagen became the club's first president. Noted Chicago architect Robert Work, who was associated with David Adler, designed the first clubhouse, which was opened in 1926 and burned to the ground in 1930. Work designed the second clubhouse as well, which opened in 1931 and still stands.

Government
Barrington Hills was incorporated in 1957. It was then composed of land only in the northwest corner of Cook County, and expanded over the next five years to its approximate configuration of today. In 1959, areas in McHenry and Lake counties joined the village, and in 1962 the village of Middlebury in Kane County was annexed. With the incorporation of Middlebury, the village government acquired its first building, a single-room school house converted into a police station.  The Village of Barrington Hills is a home rule municipality which functions under the council-manager form of government with a Village President and a six-member board of trustees, all of whom are elected at large to staggered four-year terms. The current village President is Brian D Cecola. There are six current members of the Board of Trustees Colleen Konicek Hannigan, Bryan Croll, Brian D. Cecola, Robert Zuback and Paula Jacobsen. Officers of the village include a village treasurer, a village clerk, a building code enforcement officer and a village manager. The village manager is Anna Paul. The current Village Hall was constructed in 1974 with a substantial addition in 1993. The building hosts the Barrington Hills Police station, administrative offices and public meeting rooms. Barrington Area Council of Governments BACOG offices are also located on this site. A fire station was constructed in 1994 on the grounds.

Education

The only public school located in the village is Countryside Elementary School, with about 500 students, in grades K-5, in the Barrington Community Unit School District 220. Students from Countryside either attend Barrington Middle School Prairie or Barrington Middle School Station. Older students attend the nearby Barrington High School. Portions of the village are also within CUSD 300 of Dundee-Crown High School. Also the village is served by Cary-Grove High School. Some families send their children to the private Elgin Academy.

Geography
Barrington Hills is located at  (42.1399063, -88.2034182).

The village is located within the Fox River watershed of the greater Illinois River waterway. Locally there are two perennial stream courses known to the west as Spring Creek and to the east as Flint Creek. Over the years, Flint Creek has been impounded such that along its course in the Cook County portion of the village are substantial lakes with such names as Hawley, Hawthorne, and Keene.

Residential properties of over  covered 30 percent. There is no downtown center, but the village has a small shopping strip along Route 14. With a population of 4,209 in 2010, Barrington Hills has kept its rural flavor as industrial and commercial development has sprung up around its borders.

The village is bordered on the west by East Dundee, Carpentersville, and Algonquin; on the north by Fox River Grove, and Lake Barrington; on the east by Barrington and Inverness; and to the south and southeast by South Barrington, and Hoffman Estates. Barrington Hills is one of only three municipalities in Illinois (along with Aurora and Centralia) with land located among four counties.

Demographics

2020 Census
As of the 2020 census there were 4,114 people, 1,438 households, and 1,277 families residing in the village. The racial makeup of the village was 83.01% White, 8.51% Asian, 1.05% African American, 0.12% Native American, 0.95% from other races, and 6.37% from two or more races. Hispanic or Latino of any race were 5.15% of the population.

There were 1,438 households, out of which 64.05% had children under the age of 18 living with them, 78.30% were married couples living together, 5.15% had a female householder with no husband present, and 11.20% were non-families. 9.87% of all households were made up of individuals, and 5.98% had someone living alone who was 65 years of age or older. The average household size was 3.08 and the average family size was 2.88.

The village's age distribution consisted of 22.2% under the age of 18, 7.2% from 18 to 24, 11% from 25 to 44, 34.9% from 45 to 64, and 24.7% who were 65 years of age or older. The median age was 50.2 years. For every 100 females, there were 92.2 males. For every 100 females age 18 and over, there were 83.6 males.

The median income for a household in the village was $157,414, and the median income for a family was $181,181. Males had a median income of $118,716 versus $40,148 for females. The per capita income for the village was $88,747. About 5.5% of families and 8.3% of the population were below the poverty line, including 12.5% of those under age 18 and 1.4% of those age 65 or over.

2000 Census
As of the census of 2000, there were 3,915 people, 1,381 households, and 1,168 families residing in the village.  The population density was 140.4 people per square mile (54.2/km).  There were 1,456 housing units at an average density of 52.2 per square mile (20.2/km).  The racial makeup of the village was 94.30% White, 0.46% African American, 3.91% Asian, 0.74% from other races, and 0.59% from two or more races. Hispanic or Latino of any race were 1.92% of the population.

There were 1,381 households, out of which 33.6% had children under the age of 18 living with them, 78.9% were married couples living together, 3.5% had a female householder with no husband present, and 15.4% were non-families. 12.5% of all households were made up of individuals, and 5.3% had someone living alone who was 65 years of age or older.  The average household size was 2.83 and the average family size was 3.10.

In the village, the population was spread out, with 25.3% under the age of 18, 4.6% from 18 to 24, 20.0% from 25 to 44, 37.7% from 45 to 64, and 12.4% who were 65 years of age or older.  The median age was 45 years. For every 100 females, there were 98.1 males.  For every 100 females age 18 and over, there were 98.6 males.

The median income for a household in the village was $145,330, and the median income for a family was $156,002. Males had a median income of over $100,000 versus $56,167 for females. The per capita income for the village was $73,629.  About 0.9% of families and 3.1% of the population were below the poverty line, including 3.9% of those under age 18 and none of those age 65 or over.

The village ranks 87th on the list of highest-income places in the United States with a population over 1,000, with nearby North Barrington, South Barrington, and Inverness also making the list.

Notable people 

 Tony Accardo (1906–1992), organized crime figure
 Greg Brown, CEO of Motorola
 Bill Moseley (born 1951), film actor and musician
 Terry Moran (born 1959), ABC News Senior National Correspondent (grew up in Barrington Hills)
 Henry Paulson (born 1946), Goldman Sachs CEO (1998–2006), U.S. Treasury Secretary (2006–2009)
 Jasper Sanfilippo (1931-2020), President and CEO of nut conglomerate John B. Sanfilippo & Son, Inc., noted philanthropist, and founder of the Place de la Musique private museum.
 Richard J. Stephenson, Chairman of Cancer Treatment Centers of America
 Harry Mohr Weese (1915–1998), architect and planner

References

External links

 Village of Barrington Hills

Chicago metropolitan area
Populated places established in 1957
Villages in Cook County, Illinois
Villages in Illinois
Villages in Kane County, Illinois
Villages in Lake County, Illinois
Villages in McHenry County, Illinois
1957 establishments in Illinois